The County of Raglan is a county (a cadastral division) in Queensland, Australia, located mostly within the Shire of Banana in Central Queensland. The county was first created in January 1854 by the office of the Colonial Secretary of New South Wales. On 7 March 1901, the Governor issued a proclamation legally dividing Queensland into counties under the Land Act 1897. Its schedule described Raglan thus:

Parishes 
Raglan is divided into parishes, as listed below:

References

External links 

 

Raglan